For association football in Germany, this page details football records in Germany.

National team

Appearances
 Most appearances: 150, Lothar Matthäus
 Youngest player: Willy Baumgärtner, 17 years, 104 days, 5 April 1908, 3–5 v Switzerland
 Oldest player: Lothar Matthäus, 39 years, 91 days, 20 June 2000, 0–3 v Portugal
 Oldest debutant: Karl Sesta, 35 years, 83 days, 15 June 1941, 5–1 v Croatia

Goals
 First goal: Fritz Becker, 5 April 1908, 3–5 v Switzerland
 Most goals: 71, Miroslav Klose
 Most goals in a match: 10, Gottfried Fuchs (v Russia, 1912 Summer Olympics)
 Youngest goalscorer: Marius Hiller, 17 years, 241 days, 3 April 1910, 3–2 v Switzerland

Men's Honours

Major competitions 
FIFA World Cup
 Champions (4): 1954, 1974, 1990, 2014
 Runners-up (4): 1966, 1982, 1986, 2002
 Third place (4): 1934, 1970, 2006, 2010
 Fourth place (1): 1958

UEFA European Championship
 Champions (3): 1972, 1980, 1996
 Runners-up (3): 1976, 1992, 2008
 Third place (3): 1988, 2012, 2016

Summer Olympic Games
 Gold Medal (1): 1976
 Silver Medal (2): 1980, 2016
 Bronze Medal (3): 1964, 1972, 1988
 Fourth place (1): 1952

FIFA Confederations Cup
 Champions (1): 2017
 Third place (1): 2005

Women's Honours

Major competitions 
FIFA Women's World Cup
 Champions (2): 2003, 2007
 Runners-up (1): 1995
 Fourth place (2): 1991, 2015

UEFA Women's Championship
 Champions (8): 1989, 1991, 1995, 1997, 2001, 2005, 2009, 2013
 Runners-up (1): 2022
 Fourth place (1): 1993

Summer Olympic Games
 Gold Medal (1): 2016
 Bronze Medal (3): 2000, 2004, 2008

League

Titles
 Most championships won: 32, Bayern Munich
 Most consecutive championships: 10
 Bayern Munich (2013–2022)
 Most East German championships: 10, Dynamo Berlin
 Most consecutive East German championships: 10, Dynamo Berlin (1979–1988)

Attendances
 Record attendance: 100,000, SC Rotation Leipzig v SC Lokomotive Leipzig at Zentralstadion (September 1956)

Individual records

Appearances
Most Bundesliga appearances: 602, Charly Körbel

Goals
 Most career league goals: Erwin Helmchen
 Most career domestic top-flight goals: 404, Uwe Seeler
 Most Bundesliga goals: 365, Gerd Müller
 Most Bundesliga goals in one season: 41, Robert Lewandowski (2020–21)

Most successful clubs overall (1902–present)

Key

Performance by club

(Sorted by overall titles. Use sorting button to change criteria.)

Last updated on 30 July 2022, following Bayern Munich winning the 2022 DFL-Supercup.

The figures in bold represent the most times this competition has been won by a German team.

References

Football records and statistics in Germany
 
Records
Football
Germany